El Caño is one of Panama's most important archaeological sites, located in the area surrounding the location of El Caño. Over the course of the last century archaeologists have been discovering several pre-Columbian burial sites at this location that are believed to date between 700-1000 AD. These burial sites have become very important to the scientific community because they have helped researchers gain a better understanding of the dynamic system of the Hierarchical (Hierarchy) chiefdom based societies created by the people who lived in this region of Central America before contact with Europeans.

History of archaeological work in El Caño 

The first discovery at El Caño was made in 1925 when an American adventurer named Hyatt Verrill dug up three skeletons in the area. Verril was attracted to the area after finding several unusual shaped rocks (which would turn out to be ancient monoliths) sticking out of the ground while he was walking along the banks of the Rio Grande River (in Panama). After his discovery Verril reported the site's location to several archaeologist in the United States, but was promptly ignored. Even though Archaeologist would be finding extraordinary artifacts made of gold and other precious materials just a few miles away in Sitio Conte throughout the 1930s and 1940s, there was no formal investigations ever launched at El Caño until the 1970s.

The 1970s 

The first formal investigation of a claimed burial site located at El Caño was conducted by a group of American archaeologist who were researching the written accounts from early Spanish Conquistadors. According to many of the Spanish accounts, while travelling through this region they made contact with a group of people who lived in a society ruled by a small number of elites and created magnificent forms of gold work. In later Spanish accounts of the battles against these indigenous people, it was noted by Spanish soldiers that the higher elites of these societies differentiated themselves from lower ranks by wearing golden chest plates and other forms of jewelry as they fought in battle. Spanish explorers claimed that there were countless number of stories from the indigenous population telling of ceremonial burial sites that laid along the river, many of which held the bodies of priest and other high elites who were adorned with golden chest plates and other golden artifacts. According to one story written throughout the time of Spanish occupation, it was reported that a group of Spaniards discovered one of these graves and looted 335 pounds of gold objects.

After a considerable amount of excavating at El Caño during the 1970s, archaeologist only managed to find the remains of 16 individuals. No one ever managed to discover any large volumes of gold filled graves like the Spanish had talked about in their written accounts. In 1979 archaeological work in this region of Panama dropped significantly due to the rise of Panama's Democratic Revolutionary Party and a change of politics that swept across the nation. Although some archaeology continued in Panama throughout the 1980s, the interest in the artifacts found at El Caño was not enough to keep scientist to remain at the site. Work at El Caño ceased and wouldn't resume until the mid 1990s.

The 1990s and surveying the site 

After the collapse of the Soviet Union in 1991 and Panama's 1994 election of a new president (Ernesto Pérez Balladares), the relationship between the United States and Panama improved enough for archaeological work to resume at sites that had been abandoned and neglected for 15 years. Although there had been some talks of resuming excavation at El Caño many archaeologist continued to be content with the information that they obtained during the 1970s. In the early 2000s an archaeologist named Julia Mayo who had previously been working at the neighboring site of Sitio Conte decided to launch a formal re-investigation of El Caño. Mayo believed that the people who lived at  El Caño may have been a branch of the Sitio Conte Culture that Harvard archaeologist Samuel Kirkland Lothrop theorized in a report written in 1937.

2005 

In 2005 Mayo launched a ground survey using new electrical surveying technology that had never been used at the site. Their main goal was to determine if there actually were any burial sites at El Caño, and if there were burial sites at El Caño they wanted to know how much area the burial sites took up. Using Transient electromagnetics a team of geologist found several sets of circular magnetic anomalies at the base of several earthen mounds. Many of these anomalies were specifically located in coordination to where rain runoff had eroded away the sides of the lower portions of the mounds.

After two years the information gathered through the survey determined that there was a clear circular outline of disturbance in the landscape that looked to contain the burials of Pre-Columbian people. This area was found among a series of stone monoliths and statues, and it was recorded to be approximately 250 feet (80 Meters) in diameter.

First excavation in 2008 

After the survey, mayo and a team of archaeologists from the Smithsonian Tropical Research Institute located in Panama City spent some time going over the information they obtained and forming a base of questions for their research at the site. In 2008 Mayo's team began their first excavation at El Caño (after 29 years of the site being abandoned). Not long after they started excavating they  discovered the body of a high elite warrior dressed in golden breastplates and adorned with jewelry made of golden beads.

2011 

As work continued on the excavation at El Caño news began to spread rapidly about the discoveries being made at the site. The excitement in the region built up rapidly and in 2011 the project received large contributions from the Panamanian Government and National Geographic. This allowed Mayo and her team to start a new excavation pit. In this new pit they would find the biggest discovery currently at El Caño. Here they found the body of warrior chief adorned in gold artifacts while laying atop 25 specifically arranged bodies of other individuals.

El Caño's archaeology as of 2016 

As of 2016, Archaeology work is still being carried out at the burial sites located at El Caño and many spectacular artifacts are still being pulled out of the ground. Archaeologist who have worked on the site believe that even though there have been many great discoveries, scientist have hardly scratched the surface of what El Caño can offer to the scientific world. It has also brought academics of all fields of study to question several other places in the surrounding area that have been speculated to contain archaeological sites that have never been investigated.

The rise of tourism in El Caño 

Although the discovery of the burial sites at El Caño have contributed a lot to the academic world, it has also done a lot to change the economics of the region. The discovery at El Caño has become something that is celebrated among members of the local population and the rest of Panama. The discovery of golden artifacts and the pre-Columbine tombs have aroused the interest of people worldwide. People who feel captivated by the concept of adventure have begun to travel to El Caño so they can feel the excitement of discovery. In recent years tourism has been rising in El Caño and today the local population have worked with Archaeologist to create a small archaeological park that people can visit.

Visitors to the park can have the opportunity to walk along several paths that take them through the archaeological site. They can also get the opportunity to visit the 2011 excavation pit where the warrior chief was discovered, it now resides inside a constructed building to protect it from the elements. Archaeologist have taken the liberty to place several of the encased skeletons found at the site back into the pit in order give visitors a perspective on how the pit looked when it was being excavated. If visitors want more information they can also go to the visitor center which holds a museum  that contains artifacts found on the site. It has become so important to the region that it is often advertised in tour programs and online advertisements.

References

Archaeological sites in Panama